Werner Zvi Hirsch (June 10, 1920 – July 10, 2009) was a German-born American economist. Born in small-town Germany, Hirsch emigrated to Mandatory Palestine (later known as Israel) to escape the Nazis in the late 1930s, where he attended the Hebrew University of Jerusalem. He emigrated to the United States in 1946 and received a PhD in economics from the University of California, Berkeley in 1949. He was a professor of economics at the University of California, Los Angeles (UCLA) from 1963 to 1990. He was an expert on urban economics and higher education policy.

Early life
Hirsch was born on June 20, 1920, in Linz am Rhein, Germany. Due to the rise of antisemitic National Socialism in Germany, Hirsch and his family moved to Haifa, Mandatory Palestine (now known as Israel) in 1936. He took the middle name 'Zvi' in Israel.

Hirsch attended the Hebrew University of Jerusalem. He emigrated to the United States in 1946 and earned a bachelor's degree from the University of California, Berkeley in 1947. He earned a PhD in economics from Berkeley in 1949.

Career
Hirsch worked at Berkeley from 1949 to 1951. He was an economist at the Brookings Institution in 1952. He taught economics at the Washington University in St. Louis from 1953 to 1962.

Hirsch became a professor of economics at the University of California, Los Angeles in 1963. He served as the first director of the Institute of Government and Public Affairs at UCLA. He retired from UCLA in 1990. Meanwhile, he worked for the RAND Corporation, the Kerner Commission, the United States Congress Joint Economic Committee, the United States Department of Housing and Urban Development, the Internal Revenue Service, and the National Science Foundation. Meanwhile, with Luc E. Weber, Hirsch was the co-founder of the Glion Colloquium, a think tank on higher education which published many books about higher education policy.

Hirsch endowed the Werner Z. Hirsch Award in Representational Drawing in the Department of Art at UCLA.

Personal life and death
Hirsch married Hilde Emma Zwiren, known as Esther, whom he met in Israel. They resided in Los Angeles, California, where he died of pancreatic cancer on July 10, 2009.

Works

References

1920 births
2009 deaths
Writers from Rhineland-Palatinate
Jewish emigrants from Nazi Germany to Mandatory Palestine
20th-century American economists
Hebrew University of Jerusalem alumni
University of California, Berkeley alumni
Washington University in St. Louis faculty
University of California, Los Angeles faculty
Deaths from pancreatic cancer
Mandatory Palestine emigrants to the United States